Haeke (’Aeke) is a divergent and nearly extinct indigenous language of New Caledonia, in the commune of Koné.

References

Languages of New Caledonia
Endangered Austronesian languages
Endangered languages of Oceania
New Caledonian languages